The Wyoming Craton is a craton in the west-central United States and western Canada – more specifically, in Montana, Wyoming, southern Alberta, southern Saskatchewan, and parts of northern Utah. Also called the Wyoming Province, it is the initial core of the continental crust of North America.

The Wyoming Craton was sutured together with the Superior and Hearne-Rae cratons in the mountain-building episode that created the Trans-Hudson Suture Zone to form the core of North America (Laurentia). It was incorporated into southwest Laurentia approximately 1.86 billion years ago.

Local preservation of 3.6–3.0 Ga gneisses and widespread isotopic evidence for crust of this age incorporated into younger plutons indicates that the Wyoming Craton originated as a 100,000 km2 middle Archean craton that was modified by late Archean volcanic magmatism and plate movements and Proterozoic extension and rifting.

The Wyoming, Superior and Hearne-Ray cratons were once sections of separate continents, but today they are all welded together. The collisions of these cratons began before ca. 1.77 Ga, with post-tectonic magmatism at ca. 1.715 Ga (the Harney Peak granite). This tectonic-magmatic interval is 50–60 million years younger than that reported for the Hearne-Superior collision of the Trans-Hudson orogeny in Canada.

Younger metamorphic dates (1.81–1.71 Ga) also typify the eastern and northern Wyoming province peripheries in the western Dakotas and southeastern Montana. The final assembly of the eastern Wyoming Craton as part of the continent Laurentia began during the ca. 1.78–1.74 Ga interval of island-arc accretion along the southern margin of the growing craton.

Geologic summary
The Precambrian basement of Wyoming consists mainly of three major geologic terranes, the Archean Wyoming Craton or Province, the Paleoproterozoic Trans-Hudson orogen, and the Paleoproterozoic Colorado orogeny. The Colorado orogen collided with the Wyoming Craton at 1.78–1.75 Ga. Collision of the Colorado orogen and the Trans-Hudson orogen with the Archean craton produced strong structural overprinting along the southern and eastern margins of the Wyoming craton.

The Wyoming Craton consists mainly of two gross rock units—granitoid plutons (2.8–2.55 Ga) and gneiss and migmatite—together with subordinate (<10 percent) supracrustal metavolcanic-metasedimentary rocks. The granitoid rocks are mainly potassic granite and were derived principally from reworked older (3.1–2.8 Ga) gneiss. Magnetic contrast between the granitoid rocks and gneiss provides a means to map these gross rock units in covered areas. The overall structural pattern of the Archean units shown by magnetic data is crudely semi-circular and open to the north.

Wyoming province subdivisions
The present-day lithospheric architecture of the Wyoming Province is the result of cumulative processes of crustal growth, tectonic modification, and lithospheric contrasts that have apparently persisted for billions of years.

The Wyoming province can be subdivided into three subprovinces, namely, from oldest to youngest, the Montana metasedimentary province, the Beartooth–Bighorn magmatic zone, and the Southern accreted terranes. Archean rocks of the Montana metasedimentary province and the Beartooth-Bighorn magmatic zone are characterized by (1) their antiquity (rock ages to 3.5 Ga, detrital zircon ages up to 4.0 Ga, and Nd model ages exceeding 4.0 Ga); (2) a distinctly enriched 207Pb/204Pb isotopic signature, which suggests that this part of the province was not produced by the amalgamation of already-formed exotic terranes; and (3) a distinctively thick (15–20 km), mafic lower crust. The Montana metasedimentary province and Beartooth–Bighorn magmatic zone were established as cratons by about 3.0–2.8 Ga. Crustal growth occurred through a combination of continental-arc magmatism resulting from oceanic crust subducted beneath continental crust on an adjacent plate, creating an arc-shaped mountain belt, together with terrane accretion in the Southern accreted terranes along the southern margin of the province at 2.68–2.50 Ga. By the end of the Archean, the three subprovinces were joined as part of what is now the Wyoming craton. Subsequent to amalgamation of the Wyoming crust to Laurentia at ca. 1.8–1.9 Ga, Paleoproterozoic crust (1.7–2.4 Ga) was juxtaposed along the southern and western boundaries of the province. Subsequent tectonism and magmatism in the Wyoming region are concentrated in the areas underlain by these Proterozoic mobile belts.

An analysis by Kevin Chamberlain et al. (2003), on the basis of differences in late Archean histories, subdivides the Wyoming Province into five subprovinces: three in the Archean core, (1) the Montana metasedimentary province, (2) the Bighorn subprovince, and (3) the Sweetwater subprovince, and two Archean terrains that may have originated elsewhere (that is, allochthonous to the 3.0 Ga craton), (4) the Sierra Madre – Medicine Bow block, and (5) the Black Hills – Hartville block. Based on imaging by the "Deep Probe" analysis, a thick lower crustal layer corresponds geographically with the Bighorn subprovince and may be an underplate associated with ca. 2.70 Ga mafic magmatism. The Sweetwater subprovince is characterized by an east–west-tending tectonic grain that was established by three or more roughly contemporaneous late Archean, pulses of basin development, shortening, and arc magmatism. This tectonic grain, including the 2.62 Ga Oregon Trail structure, controlled the locations and orientations of Proterozoic rifting and uplifts related to the Laramide orogeny. If there has been any net crustal growth of the Wyoming Province since 3.0 Ga, it has involved a combination of mafic underplating and arc magmatism.

Accretion events
During the Paleoproterozoic, island-arc terrane associated with the Colorado orogeny accreted to the Wyoming Craton along the Cheyenne belt, a 500-km-wide belt of Proterozoic rocks named for Cheyenne, Wyoming. As a result of the collision, older, Archean rocks of the Wyoming province were intensely deformed and metamorphosed for at least 75 km inboard from the suture, which is marked today by the Laramie Mountains. Along the east margin of the craton, collision with the Paleoproterozoic Trans-Hudson orogen intensely deformed Archean cratonic rocks in the Hartville uplift. 

Mesoproterozoic (~1.4 Ga) anorthosite and syenites of the Laramie Anorthosite Complex and granite (ilmenite-bearing Sherman Granite) intrude into rocks of the Colorado orogen in the Laramie and adjacent Medicine Bow Mountains. Both the anorthosite and granite transect the Cheyenne belt in the Laramide Mountains, and intrude crystalline rocks of the Wyoming province. These intrusions comprise the northernmost segment of a wide belt of 1.4 Ga granitic intrusions that occur throughout the Colorado orogen.

Long after its assembly, the Wyoming Craton owes its spectacular mountainous terranes mainly to a regional episode of compressional deformation during the Laramide orogeny (ca.60 Ma). The basement blocks composed of Precambrian rocks were uplifted locally to high levels in the crust during the deformation, and subsequent erosion has molded the uplifted rocks into the rugged present-day topography. Vertical displacement of the basement surface was as much as 30,000 ft. (9250 m). By contrast, in western Wyoming thrust faulting, associated with the Sevier orogeny of approximately the same age, was thin-skinned, and the lack of disruption of magnetic anomalies in the region indicates that the basement rocks were little disturbed and not significantly uplifted during the thrusting. Even younger high-angle faulting of Pliocene–Pleistocene age has formed the Teton Range. Vertical relief on the east face of the mountains is about 25,000 ft. (7800 m).

See also
 North American Craton
 Cheyenne belt
 Colorado orogeny
 Grouse Creek block located west of the craton
 Superior Craton

References

Cratons
Proterozoic geology
Proterozoic North America
Geology of North America
Precambrian Canada
Precambrian United States
Geology of Wyoming
Geology of Montana
Geology of Alberta
Geology of Saskatchewan
Geology of Utah
Geology of the United States